Harry Emerson Rowbottom (November 3, 1884 – March 22, 1934) was an American businessman and Republican politician. He was elected to the United States House of Representatives from Indiana in 1924 and served three terms from 1925 to 1931. He was defeated for re-election in 1930 and subsequently convicted of accepting bribes, abruptly terminating his political career.

Biography
Rowbottom was born in Aurora, Indiana and moved with his parents to Ludlow, Kentucky in 1885. In Kentucky he attended the common schools, graduated from Ludlow High School in 1901, and subsequently attended Kentucky State College at Lexington from 1902 to 1904.

From 1904 to 1907 Rowbottom worked selling lubricating oils. He graduated from the Cincinnati Business College in 1907, where he studied accountancy. Following graduation, Rowbottom found work as an auditor in Cincinnati from 1907 to 1910 and Chicago from 1910 to 1912. He moved to Evansville, Indiana in 1913 and was employed as chief clerk for the Indiana Refining Company from 1913 to 1918.

Politics
Rowbottom was elected to the Indiana House of Representatives in 1918, serving two consecutive terms from 1919 to 1923. His legislative service coincided with the end of World War I and the Red Summer of 1919, which witnessed the rise of the second Ku Klux Klan. Like many prominent Indiana Republicans, Rowbottom sought out the Klan's electoral support and proudly boasted of his membership in the organization. With the Klan's endorsement he was elected to the United States House of Representatives in 1924, defeating Democratic incumbent William E. Wilson in Indiana's 1st congressional district. Klan-backed candidates won up and down the ballot in 1924, with local Klan leader D. C. Stephenson widely believed to have orchestrated the nomination of the incoming Republican governor, Edward L. Jackson. Rowbottom's victory in traditionally Democratic southern Indiana, coming despite Wilson's eminent public stature and Rowbottom's comparatively poor reputation, was considered as major upset.

Rowbottom was re-elected in 1926 and 1928, serving from 1925 to 1931. He was defeated for re-election to the 72nd Congress in 1930 following the onset of the Great Depression, which was blamed on the Republican Party and the administration of Herbert Hoover. During his final term in office, Rowbottom was indicted for accepting bribes in exchange for appointments to jobs with the United States Postal Service. He was found guilty in 1931 and incarcerated at Leavenworth prison.

Death
He died in Evansville on March 22, 1934 and is interred in Locust Hill Cemetery.

See also
List of American federal politicians convicted of crimes
List of federal political scandals in the United States

References
Notes

Sources

External links

1884 births
1934 deaths
20th-century American politicians
American accountants
Indiana politicians convicted of crimes
Republican Party members of the Indiana House of Representatives
People from Aurora, Indiana
People from Kenton County, Kentucky
United States federal public corruption crime
Republican Party members of the United States House of Representatives from Indiana